The 1941 New Mexico A&M Aggies football team was an American football team that represented New Mexico College of Agriculture and Mechanical Arts (now known as New Mexico State University) as a member of the Border Conference during the 1941 college football season.  In its second year under head coach Julius H. Johnston, the team compiled a 2–7 record (0–6 against conference opponents), finished in last place in the conference, and was outscored by a total of 228 to 93. The team played its home games at Quesenberry Field in Las Cruces, New Mexico.

End Rex Dempsey was selected by the conference coaches as a second-team player on the 1941 All-Border Conference football team.

Schedule

References

New Mexico AandM
New Mexico State Aggies football seasons
New Mexico AandM Aggies football